Jeffrey Todd Laitman, Ph.D. (born October 13, 1951) is an American anatomist and physical anthropologist whose science has combined experimental, comparative, and paleontological studies to understand the development and evolution of the human upper respiratory and vocal tract regions.  He is Distinguished Professor of the Icahn School of Medicine at Mount Sinai (formerly Mount Sinai School of Medicine) in New York City where he holds other positions, including: Professor and Director of the Center for Anatomy and Functional Morphology, Professor of Otolaryngology and Professor of Medical Education.

Scientific research
Laitman's laboratory at Mount Sinai explores both basic biological aspects of developmental change in a range of mammals—from rodents to nonhuman primates to whales—and how these systems have changed through time.  In the area of development, Laitman and colleagues have made considerable strides in investigating change in the breathing, swallowing and vocalizing patterns of human infants.  This work has had considerable implications for understanding both basic human anatomy as well as certain clinical disorders such as Sudden Infant Death Syndrome, also known as Crib Death.

Laitman's research on the evolution of the aerodigestive tract has helped to usher in a new methodology that enables the use of fossil remains as a guide to reconstructing the vocal tract of human ancestors.  His work in this area has shed light on the distinguishing features of the human respiratory system, and has had particular implications for understanding the origins of human speech and language.  Laitman's studies have frequently been the source of much discussion on how living humans may differ from other groups, such as Neanderthals.  His work has frequently been covered in the lay and scientific press, and he has often appeared in television documentaries on human origins and the evolution of speech and language both in the United States and abroad, such as the award-winning Miracle Planet Series,  the BBC Documentary, The Day We Learned to Think, and The History Channel documentary, Clash of the Cavemen.

Education and teaching
He has introduced the use of laparoscopes and robots into first-year anatomy education, and collaborated with medical students to teach musculoskeletal anatomy through yoga and Pilates, the latter innovation having received national awards and recognitions.  Laitman and colleagues have also pioneered new approaches to introducing "team-work," "team-responsibility" and "team-teaching," that bring these essential components of physician development early into the medical school curriculum.  He has been particularly successful in mentoring faculty, many of whom have won educational awards both from Mount Sinai and international societies.  Laitman has created Teaching Assistant programs for advanced medical and graduate students that allow them to learn how to teach while gaining an even greater knowledge of anatomy.  He has been the recipient of many recognitions for teaching and mentorship both within Mount Sinai and from societies around the world.

Biography
Laitman took his bachelor's degree at Brooklyn College of the City University of New York, from which he graduated summa cum laude with honors in Physical Anthropology and History in 1973.  Upon graduation from Brooklyn College, he undertook graduate study in Physical Anthropology and Anatomy at Yale University, where he received his M.Phil. in 1975 and Ph.D. in 1977.  At Yale Laitman studied under noted anatomist Edmund S. Crelin of the Yale School of Medicine, paleoanthropologist David R. Pilbeam, paleontologist Elwyn Simons, and primate biologists Alison Richard and Robert D. Martin.  He also studied under the famous French paleanthropologist Yves Coppens at the Musée de l'Homme and Collège de France, both as a student and during many subsequent research visits to Paris.  In 1976, while still a graduate student, he was appointed Lecturer in Anatomy at the Yale University School of Medicine and, in 1977, chosen a Research Fellow of the Human Growth and Development Study Unit at Yale University School of Medicine.

In 1977, Laitman joined the faculty of the Mount Sinai School of Medicine as Instructor in Anatomy.  He is currently Distinguished Professor of the Mount Sinai School of Medicine, Professor and Director of Anatomy and Functional Morphology, Professor of Otolaryngology, Professor of Medical Education and Director of Gross Anatomy at Icahn School of Medicine at Mount Sinai; and Professor in the Graduate Faculties of Biomedical Sciences of Mount Sinai and of Anthropology of the City University of New York.  Laitman is also a research associate at the American Museum of Natural History, and member of the faculty of the New York Consortium in Evolutionary Primatology (NYCEP), a research-training program supported by the National Science Foundation.

Mentoring, students, and collaborators
Laitman has been the research advisor and mentor for many medical and graduate-level students that have gone on to prominent careers in medicine, science, and medical education.  Notable amongst these are: comparative anatomists, Joy Reidenberg, Ph.D and Samuel Marquez, Ph.D.; neurobiologist Patrick J. Gannon, Ph.D.; otologist/neurobiologist, David R. Friedland, M.D., Ph.D; anthropologists Douglas Broadfield, Ph.D. and Anthony Pagano, Ph.D.; developmental anatomist Armand Balboni, Ph.D; head and neck cancer surgeon, Eric Genden, M.D.; and health and exercise specialists, Carrie McCulloch, M.D. and Stephanie Pieczenik Marango, M.D..  He has mentored many students in research and taught over 5,000 medical students over his career.  Laitman has also mentored many young scientists from around the world, many of whom have come to work in his Laboratory at Mount Sinai.  He collaborates frequently with colleagues both in the United States and abroad on a range of scientific and educational projects.

Activities in scientific and scholarly societies
Laitman is an active member in a number of scientific and scholarly societies, most notably the American Association of Anatomists (AAA), one of the premier scientific and educational societies in the world.  He has held many positions in the AAA, including being elected a Member of the Board of Directors from 2006–2009.  In 2009 Laitman was elected President of the Association and will serve as President-Elect from 2009–2011, President from 2011–13, and Past-President from 2013–2015.  In 2009 he was elected Vice President of The Mount Sinai Alumni, Inc., and in 2011 elected President of that organization.  In 2009 he was also elected Vice-Chair of the Anatomical Committee of the Associated Medical Schools of New York (ASMSNY).  Laitman also serves as Associate Editor and Editor for Functional and Evolutionary Morphology for The Anatomical Record, and in that role has overseen many special issues of that journal, such as ones on aquatic mammals, paranasal sinuses, dinosaurs, primate functional anatomy, new world monkey evolution, the anatomy underlying new advances in cochlear and vestibular implants and the evolution of primate special senses.

Public education and outreach
Laitman also frequently offers public lectures on his science and educational topics.  He has given addresses at venues both within the United States and abroad such as at: The American Museum of Natural History, The Australian Museum, The American Association for the Advancement of Science (AAAS) Frontiers of Science Lecture Series at the Smithsonian, The Musée de l'Homme, The National Museum of Natural History, The Leakey Lecture at the Field Museum of Natural History and The Chicago Humanities Festival.  Laitman has also been deeply involved in bringing science to grade-school and high school students, creating experiences at Mount Sinai and lecturing at public schools in Chicago and New York as part of The Leakey Foundation science outreach programs.

Notable awards and recognitions
Fellow, American Anthropological Association
Medal of the Collège de France
Honorary Fellow, Associazione Per L'Amicizia Fra I Popoli di Italia
Basmajian/Williams & Wilkins Award of The American Association of Anatomists
Guest of Honor, 1st Int'l Laryngotracheal Reconstruction Symposium
61st James Arthur Lecturer, American Museum of Natural History
Karl Storz Award, American Society for Pediatric Otolaryngology
Distinguished Professor of the Mount Sinai School of Medicine
Daniel C. Baker Award, American Laryngological Association
Fellow, American Association for the Advancement of Science (AAAS)
Abraham Jacobi Medallion. The Mount Sinai Alumni
Fellow, American Association of Anatomists
Award for Achievement in Medical Education, The Mount Sinai Alumni
Alfonso Bovero Award, Brazilian Society of Anatomy
Corresponding Member, Brazilian Society of Anatomy
The Leakey Foundation Lecturer on Human Origins 
Chinese Society of Anatomical Sciences, Annual Meeting Plenary Lecture on Advances in Anatomy Education
Chevalier Jackson Lecturer, American Bronchoesophagolocial Association
Chicago Humanities Festival Featured Lecturer
Fellow, American Laryngological Association
Honorary Member, American Broncho-esophagological Association
Doctor of Medical Science (D.Med.Sc.) Honoris Causa, Medical College of Wisconsin
Commencement Address, Medical College of Wisconsin
Henry Gray Distinguished Educator Medal, American Association of Anatomists
Honorary Member, American Society of Pediatric Otolaryngology
Benning Lecture, University of Utah

Representative publications

 

Schwartz, J.H., Tattersall, I, Laitman, J.T. (1999) New thoughts on Neanderthal behavior: Evidence from nasal morphology. In: Hominid Evolution-Lifestyles and Survival Strategies, Ullrich, H. ed Gelsenkirchen, Edition Archaea, 166-186.

Márquez S, Lawson W, Schaefer S.D., Laitman J.T. (2002) Anatomy of the nasal accessory sinuses.  In: Wackym P.A., Rice D.H., Schaefer S.D., eds.  Minimally Invasive Surgery of the Head, Neck, and Cranial Base.  Philadelphia, Lippincott, Williams & Wilkins, 153-183.

Laitman, J.T., Noden, D.M., Van De Water, T.R. (2006) Formation of the larynx: from homeobox genes to critical periods. In: Rubin, J.S. (ed.) Diagnosis & Treatment Voice Disorders Plural, San Diego, pp. 3–20.

Laitman, J.T. and Reidenberg, J.S. (2009) The evolution of the human larynx: Nature's great experiment. In: Fried M.P., Ferlito, A. eds. The Larynx, 3rd ed., Plural, San Diego, 19-38.

Reidenberg, J.S. and J.T. Laitman.  (2010)  Generation of sounds in marine mammals.  In: Handbook of Mammalian Vocalization: A Neuroscience Approach.  S. Brudzynski, Ed.  Elsevier, Philadelphia, PA, 451-468.

Som, P.M., W.R. Smoker, A.L. Balboni, J.S. Reidenberg, P.A. Hudgins, J.L. Weissman, and J.T. Laitman.  (2011)  Embryology and anatomy of the neck.  In: Head and Neck Imaging, 5th Edition.  P.M. Som and H.D. Curtin, eds. Mosby, NY, 2117-2163.

Márquez, S., A. S Pagano, E.Delson, and J.T Laitman  (2014)  Examining the Nasal Complex of Neanderthals and other Later Pleistocene Human Fossils via CT and 3-D Geometric Morphometric Approaches: Analysis of Form, Function and Adaptation?   Anat. Rec., in press.
Smith, T.D., J.T. Laitman, K.P. Bhatnagar  (2014) The shrinking anthropoid nose, the human vomeronasal organ, and the language of anatomical reduction. Anat. Rec., in press.
Pagano, A.S. and J.T. Laitman  in press Three-dimensional geo-morphometric analysisof the nasopharyngeal boundaries and its functional integration with the face and external basicranium among extant hominoids.  Anat. Rec.

See also

 Animal communication
 Evolutionary linguistics
 Human evolution
 Neurobiological origins of language
 Origin of language
 Origin of speech
 Physical anthropology
 Recent African origin of modern humans

References

External links
Jeffrey Laitman Mt. Sinai Faculty Page
Jeffrey Laitman Proc National Academy of Sciences article on Neanderthals and upper respiratory tract evolution
Jeffrey Laitman Dysphagia journal article on upper respiratory and upper digestive systems

1951 births
Living people
Yale University alumni
American anthropologists
American anatomists
Evolutionary biologists
Human evolution theorists
Brooklyn College alumni
Icahn School of Medicine at Mount Sinai faculty
Fellows of the American Association for the Advancement of Science
City College of New York alumni